Santana River or Sant'Ana River may refer to:
 Santana River (Bahia), a tributary of the Cachoeira River
 Santana River (Espírito Santo), a tributary of the São Mateus River
 Santana River (Maranhão), a tributary of the Grajaú River
 Santana River (Mato Grosso do Sul), a tributary of the Paranaíba River
 Santana River (Minas Gerais), a tributary of the Rio Grande
 Santana River (Paraná), a tributary of the Chopim River
 Sant'Ana River (Piedade River tributary), in Paraná
 Sant'Ana River (Da Areia River tributary), in Paraná
 Santana River (Rio de Janeiro), a tributary of the Guandu River
 Santana River (East Timor), a river of East Timor